David Thomas Trottier (June 25, 1906 – November 14, 1956) was a Canadian professional ice hockey player who played in the 1928 Olympic Games, winning a gold medal, and played in the National Hockey League for 11 seasons. He won the Stanley Cup in 1935 with the Montreal Maroons and was the Maroons' leading scorer in the 1931–32 NHL season. He was born in Pembroke, Ontario.

Career statistics

Regular season and playoffs

International

External links

1906 births
1956 deaths
Canadian ice hockey forwards
Detroit Red Wings players
Ice hockey people from Ontario
Ice hockey players at the 1928 Winter Olympics
Medalists at the 1928 Winter Olympics
Montreal Maroons players
Olympic gold medalists for Canada
Olympic ice hockey players of Canada
Olympic medalists in ice hockey
Pittsburgh Hornets players
Sportspeople from Pembroke, Ontario
Stanley Cup champions